Eric Alper (born 1970 in Toronto)  is a Canadian music correspondent, blogger, radio host and former director of media relations, at eOne Music Canada based in Toronto, Ontario. Since 2016, Alper has run a music public relations company, That Eric Alper, and is the host of @ThatEricAlper show on SiriusXM.

Career
From 1998 till 2016 Alper was the director of media relations for eOne Music Canada working with Bob Geldof, Natalie MacMaster, Matt Dusk, Randy Bachman, Ringo Starr, Slash, The Wiggles, Snoop Dogg, The Smashing Pumpkins, Ray Charles, Sinead O'Connor, and Sesame Street.

He started his own PR company in 2016. He has appeared as a music correspondent on numerous Canadian television and radio networks including on CTV, CBC Radio 2 and SiriusXM. Alper has been named to Billboard and The National Post's Best on Twitter.  He is a prolific and highly organised prompt tweeter on Twitter with a 2021 Billboard article reporting that he posts more than 50 prompts a day, every day.

Personal
Eric Alper is the father of Hannah Alper, a Canadian activist, blogger, and motivational speaker who addresses issues such as the environment, anti-bullying, and social justice. Alper's grandfather Al Grossman opened Grossman's Tavern in 1943, which is Toronto's first licensed blues bar.

References

External links

Writers from Toronto
Canadian music journalists
Jewish Canadian journalists
Living people
1970 births